Międzyleś may refer to the following places:
Międzyleś, Lublin Voivodeship (east Poland)
Międzyleś, Mława County in Masovian Voivodeship (east-central Poland)
Międzyleś, Węgrów County in Masovian Voivodeship (east-central Poland)
Międzyleś, Wołomin County in Masovian Voivodeship (east-central Poland)